Corruption in Zimbabwe has become endemic within its political, private and civil sectors.

Corruption in the public sector
The findings of a 2000 survey commissioned by Transparency International Zimbabwe found that Zimbabwean citizens regarded the public sector as the most corrupt sector in the country. In this survey respondents favoured the police as being most corrupt followed by political parties, parliament/legislature, public officials/civil servants and the judiciary. In 2008, a Transparency International director announced that Zimbabwe loses US$5 million to corruption every day.

On Transparency International's 2022 Corruption Perceptions Index, Zimbabwe scored 23 on a scale from 0 ("highly corrupt") to 100 ("very clean"). When ranked by score, Zimbabwe ranked 157th among the 180 countries in the Index, where the country ranked last is perceived to have the most corrupt public sector.  For comparison, the best score was 90 (ranked 1), the worst score was 12 (ranked 180), and the average score was 43.

Diamond trade
In 2011, Finance Minister Tendai Biti claimed that at least US$1 billion in diamond-related revenue owed to the national treasury remains unaccounted for. Biti has blamed corruption, misappropriation and a lack of transparency for the systematic underselling of diamonds and the failure to recoup losses. In an address to parliament, Biti said “it is worrying that there is no connection whatsoever between diamond exports made by Zimbabwe and the revenues realised thereof”.

President Robert Mugabe and his politburo have also come under criticism for making personal benefits by assigning lucrative concessions in the Marange diamond fields to Chinese firms and the Zimbabwean military. The Zimbabwean military, which oversees the Marange fields, has been accused of systematic human rights abuses and smuggling of diamonds to neighbouring Mozambique.

ZimBank Lottery
In January 2000, Fallot Chawaua, the Master of Ceremonies of a promotional lottery organised by the Zimbabwe Banking Corporation,  announced that Robert Mugabe won the Z$100,000 first prize  jackpot. The lottery was open to all clients who had kept Z$5,000 or more in their ZimBank accounts.

Indigenisation bills
In March 2008, President Mugabe formally approved the Indigenisation and Economic Empowerment Bill, which gave the government the right to seize a controlling 51% stake in foreign and white-owned businesses. There are wide concerns that the beneficiaries of this Bill will be members of the ruling Zimbabwean elite, particularly after the enforcement of the Land Acquisition Act of 1992 and the Land Reform and Resettlement Programme Phase 2 of 1998 led to the misappropriation of commercial farm land and violent land invasions.

Anti-corruption efforts
Anti-corruption efforts in Zimbabwe are governed by the following legislation:

 The Prevention of Corruption Act (1983);
 Public Service Act (1995);
 The Ombudsperson Amendment Act (1997);
 Anti-Corruption Commission Bill (2004);
 The Criminal law (Codification and Reform) Act (2004);
 Bank Use Promotion and Suppression of Money Laundering Act (2004);
 Criminal Procedure and Evidence Amendment Act (2004); and
 Criminal Law (Codification and Reform) Act of 2006

The Zimbabwean Anti-Corruption Commission (ACC) was established after the passing of the Anti-Corruption Commission Bill in June 2004.
The Commission is a signatory to the Southern Africa Development Community (SADC) Protocol as well as the African Union (AU) and United Nations Convention on Anti-Corruption. However, according to a 2009 report by Global Integrity, the Commission is highly inefficient and “has very little authority to take steps aimed at stopping corruption in Zimbabwe”. Out of 147 corruption cases reviewed by the Commission in 2006, only four were completed. The ACC is currently chaired by Denfor Chirindo, who was appointed on 1 September 2011.

List Of Corruption Scandals In Zimbabwe
Here is a list of reported corruption scandals in Zimbabwe since 1980:

1987 – Zisco Steel blast Furnace Scandal
1987 – Air Zimbabwe Fokker Plane Scandal – $100 million
1986 – National Railways Housing Scandal
1988 – Willowgate Scandal
1989 – ZRP Santana Scandal
1994 – War Victims Compensation Scandal
1995 – GMB Grain Scandal
1996 – VIP Housing Scandal
1998 – Boka Banking Scandal
1998 – ZESA YTL Soltran Scandal
1998 – Telecel Scandal
1998 – Harare City Council Refuse Tender Scandal
1999 – Housing Loan Scandal
1999 – Noczim Scandal
1999 – DRC timber and diamond Un reported scandals
1999 – GMB Scandal
1999 – Ministry of water and rural development Chinese tender scandal
1999 – VIP Land Grab Scandal
2001 – Harare Airport Scandal
2008-2014 - Airport Road Scandal
2016 - Mnangagwa Command Agriculture Scandal
2018 - Zesa scam Involving Samuel Undenge's criminal abuse of office

References

Zimbabwe
Politics of Zimbabwe
Law of Zimbabwe